Hits is a 2009 compilation album by Seal, released by Warner Bros. Records. It is Seal's second compilation album following 2004's Best 1991–2004. The album was released on two formats, a one-disc standard edition featuring 19 tracks and a two-disc deluxe edition with 34 tracks. Both versions of the album included two new songs, "I Am Your Man", composed by Ashford & Simpson and previously recorded by Edwin Starr, Bobby Taylor & The Vancouvers and The Four Tops, and "Thank You Fa Lettin' Me Be Myself" by Sly & The Family Stone.

The single disc edition includes many of the single versions of the songs, whereas the deluxe edition replaces them with the album versions, or as in the case of "The Beginning", a remix. The cover also served as the artwork for the 2008 single "It's a Man's Man's Man's World".

Track listing

French edition
"I Am Your Man" 
"Kiss from a Rose" 
"Crazy" 
"Love's Divine" 
"Les Mots" – Mylène Farmer and Seal 
"A Change Is Gonna Come" 
"Amazing" 
"Killer" 
"Fly Like an Eagle" 
"Get It Together" 
"Future Love Paradise" 
"My Vision" – Jakatta and Seal 
"The Right Life" 
"Prayer for the Dying" 
"I Can't Stand the Rain" 
"Waiting for You" 
"Don't Cry" 
"It's a Man's Man's Man's World" 
"Thank You Fa Lettin' Me Be Mice Elf Again"

US limited edition
Disc one
"I Am Your Man" 
"Kiss from a Rose" 
"Crazy" 
"Fly Like an Eagle" 
"Love's Divine" 
"A Change Is Gonna Come" 
"Amazing" 
"Killer" 
"Prayer for the Dying" 
"Get It Together" 
"The Right Life" 
"Future Love Paradise" 
"Waiting for You" 
"Free" 
"Rolling" 
"Don't Cry" 
"If You Don't Know Me by Now" 
"Thank You Fa Lettin' Me Be Mice Elf Again" 
Disc two
"A Change Is Gonna Come" 
"I Can't Stand the Rain" 
"It's a Man's Man's Man's World" 
"Knock on Wood" 
"If You Don't Know Me by Now" 
"I've Been Loving You Too Long" 
"Here I Am (Come and Take Me)" 
"People Get Ready" 
"Stand by Me" 
"Kiss from a Rose" 
"Crazy" 
"If You Don't Know Me by Now" 
"A Change Is Gonna Come" 
"It's a Man's Man's Man's World" 
An Interview with David Foster

Charts

Weekly charts

Year-end charts

Certifications

References

External links
 Amazon

2009 greatest hits albums
Seal (musician) compilation albums
Albums produced by Stuart Price
Warner Records compilation albums